is a Japanese actress. She is a former pop idol.

Biography 
Miyoko Asada debuted as an idol in April 1973 with the single "Akai Fuusen" (The Red Balloon), which sold over 800,000 copies and peaked at #1 on the Japanese Oricon chart list. That same year she was nominated as Best Newcomer of the Year at the 15th Japan Record Awards, but lost the title to Junko Sakurada.

Single discography

Filmography

Film
Hi no Ataru Sakamichi (1975)
My Sons (1991)
Tsuribaka Nisshi 7 (1994)
Tsuribaka Misshi 8 (1996)
Tsuribaka Nisshi 9 (1997)
Tsuribaka Nisshi 10 (1998)
Tsuribaka Nisshi Eleven (2000)
Hashire! Ichiro (2001)
Tsuribaka Nisshi 12: Shijo Saidai no Kyuka (2001)
Tsuribaka Nisshi 13: Hama-chan kiki Ippatsu! (2002)
Tsuribaka Nisshi 14 (2003)
Tsuribaka Nisshi 15: Hama-chan ni asu wa nai? (2004)
Gin no enzeru (2004)
Tsuribaka Nisshi 16 (2005)
Saga no Gabai-baachan (2006)
Tsuribaka Nisshi 17 (2006)
Otoshimono (2006)
Red Whale, White Snake (2006)
Ai no Rukeichi]] (2007)
Sweet Bean (2015)
Running Again (2018)
Erica 38 (2019)
True Mothers (2020)
The Dignified Death of Shizuo Yamanaka (2020)
Independence of Japan (2020)
Everything Will Be Owlright! (2022)
Bridal, My Song (2022)
Ginpei-cho Cinema Blues (2023)
Trapped Balloon (2023)
Ai no Komuragaeri (2023)

Television
 Sakura (NHK, 2002)
 Shinsengumi! (NHK, 2004)
 Nyokei Kazoku (TBS, 2005)
 Jigoku no Sata mo Yome Shidai (TBS, 2007)
 Tokyo Tower (Fuji TV, 2007)
 Fūrin Kazan (NHK, 2007)
 Wachigaiya Itosato (TBS, 2007)
 Otokomae! (NHK, 2008)
 Keikan no Chi (TV Asahi, 2009)
 Hanako to Anne (NHK, 2014)
 Shiroi Kyotō (TV Asahi, 2019)

References

External links
JDorama.com

1956 births
Living people
Japanese idols
Japanese women singers
Japanese actresses
Singers from Tokyo